Drinking birds, also known as insatiable birdies, dunking birds, drinky birds, water birds, dipping birds, and “Sippy Chickens” are toy heat engines that mimic the motions of a bird drinking from a water source. They are sometimes incorrectly considered examples of a perpetual motion device.

Construction and materials
A drinking bird consists of two glass bulbs joined by a glass tube (the bird's neck). The tube extends nearly all the way into the bottom bulb, and attaches to the top bulb but does not extend into it.

The space inside the bird contains a fluid, usually colored to make the liquid more visible. The dye might fade when exposed to light, with the rate depending on the dye/color.
The fluid is typically dichloromethane (DCM), also known as methylene chloride.
Earlier versions contained trichlorofluoromethane.
Miles V. Sullivan's 1945 patent suggested ether, alcohol, carbon tetrachloride, or chloroform.

Air is removed from the apparatus during manufacture, so the space inside the body is filled by vapor evaporated from the fluid. The upper bulb has a "beak" attached which, along with the head, is covered in a felt-like material. The bird is typically decorated with paper eyes, a plastic top hat, and one or more tail feathers. The whole setup pivots on an adjustable crosspiece attached to the neck.

Heat engine steps

The drinking bird is a heat engine that exploits a temperature difference to convert heat energy to a pressure difference within the device, and performs mechanical work. Like all heat engines, the drinking bird works through a thermodynamic cycle. The initial state of the system is a bird with a wet head oriented vertically.

The process operates as follows:

 The water evaporates from the felt on the head.
 Evaporation lowers the temperature of the glass head (heat of vaporization).
 The temperature decrease causes some of the dichloromethane vapor in the head to condense.
 The lower temperature and condensation together cause the pressure to drop in the head (governed by Equations of state).
 The higher vapor pressure in the warmer base pushes the liquid up the neck.
 As the liquid rises, the bird becomes top heavy and tips over.
 When the bird tips over, the bottom end of the neck tube rises above the surface of the liquid in the bottom bulb.
 A bubble of warm vapor rises up the tube through this gap, displacing liquid as it goes.
 Liquid flows back to the bottom bulb (the toy is designed so that when it has tipped over the neck's tilt allows this). Pressure equalizes between top and bottom bulbs.
 The weight of the liquid in the bottom bulb restores the bird to its vertical position.
 The liquid in the bottom bulb is heated by ambient air, which is at a temperature slightly higher than the temperature of the bird's head.

If a glass of water is placed so that the beak dips into it on its descent, the bird will continue to absorb water and the cycle will continue as long as there is enough water in the glass to keep the head wet. However, the bird will continue to dip even without a source of water, as long as the head is wet, or as long as a temperature differential is maintained between the head and body. This differential can be generated without evaporative cooling in the head; for instance, a heat source directed at the bottom bulb will create a pressure differential between top and bottom that will drive the engine. The ultimate source of energy is the temperature gradient between the toy's head and base; the toy is not a perpetual motion machine.

Physical and chemical principles

The drinking bird is an exhibition of several physical laws and is therefore a staple of basic chemistry and physics education. These include:
 The dichloromethane with a low boiling point ( under standard pressure po = 105 Pa – as the drinking bird is first evacuated, partially filled and sealed, the pressure and thus the boiling point in the drinking bird will be different), gives the heat engine the ability to extract motion from low temperatures. The drinking bird is a heat engine that works at room temperature.
 The combined gas law, which establishes a proportional relationship between temperature and pressure exerted by a gas in a constant volume.
 The ideal gas law, which establishes a proportional relationship between number of gas particles and pressure in a constant volume.
 The Maxwell–Boltzmann distribution, which establishes that molecules in a given space at a given temperature vary in energy level, and therefore can exist in multiple phases (solid/liquid/gas) at a single temperature.
 Heat of vaporization (or condensation), which establishes that substances absorb (or give off) heat when changing state at a constant temperature.
 Torque and center of mass.
 Capillary action of the wicking felt.
 Wet-bulb temperature: The temperature difference between the head and body depends on the relative humidity of the air.

The operation of the bird is also affected by relative humidity.

By using a water-ethanol mixture instead of water, the effect of different rates of evaporation can be demonstrated.

By considering the difference between the wet and dry bulb temperatures, it is possible to develop a mathematical expression to calculate the maximum work that can be produced from a given amount of water "drunk". Such analysis is based on the definition of the Carnot heat engine efficiency and the psychrometric concepts.

History
By the 1760s (or earlier) German artisans had invented a so-called "pulse hammer" (Pulshammer). In 1767 Benjamin Franklin visited Germany, saw a pulse hammer, and in 1768, improved it.  Franklin's pulse hammer consisted of two glass bulbs connected by a U-shaped tube; one of the bulbs was partially filled with water in equilibrium with its vapor. Holding the partially filled bulb in one's hand would cause the water to flow into the empty bulb.  In 1872, the Italian physicist and engineer Enrico Bernardi combined three Franklin tubes to build a simple heat motor that was powered by evaporation in a way similar to the drinking bird.

In 1881 Israel L. Landis got a patent for a similar oscillating motor.
A year later (1882), the Iske brothers got a patent for a similar motor.
Unlike the drinking bird, the lower tank was heated and the upper tank just air-cooled in this engine. Other than that, it used the same principle. The Iske brothers during that time got various patents on a related engine which is now known as Minto wheel.

A Chinese drinking bird toy dating back to 1910s~1930s named insatiable birdie is described in Yakov Perelman's Physics for Entertainment. The book explained the "insatiable" mechanism: "Since the headtube's temperature becomes lower than that of the tail reservoir, this causes a drop in the pressure of the saturated vapours in the head-tube ..." It was said in Shanghai, China, that when Albert Einstein and his wife, Elsa, arrived in Shanghai in 1922, they were fascinated by the Chinese "insatiable birdie" toy.

In addition, the Japanese professor of toys, Takao Sakai, from Tohoku University, also introduced this Chinese toy.

Arthur M. Hillery got a US patent in 1945. Arthur M. Hillery suggested the use of acetone as working fluid.
It was again patented in the US by Miles V. Sullivan in 1946.
He was a Ph.D. inventor-scientist at Bell Labs in Murray Hill, NJ, USA. Robert T. Plate got a US Design patent in 1947, that cities Arthur M. Hillerys patent.

Notable usage in popular culture
The drinking bird has been used in many fictional contexts to automatically press buttons. In The Simpsons episode "King-Size Homer", Homer used one to repeatedly press a key on a computer keyboard. Herb Powell also showed one to Homer as part of a demonstration regarding inventions in the episode "Brother, Can You Spare Two Dimes?". Two of them were used in the 1990 film Darkman to set off explosions. Drinking birds have appeared as part of a Rube Goldberg machine in the film Pee-wee's Big Adventure and the Family Guy episode "8 Simple Rules for Buying My Teenage Daughter". In Bojack Horseman an Alcoholics Anonymous attendee resembles a Drinking Bird.

Drinking birds have been featured as plot elements in the 1951 Merrie Melodies cartoon Putty Tat Trouble and the 1968 science fiction thriller The Power. They have also had minor appearances in several movies and TV shows, including mission briefings in two episodes of TV's original Mission: Impossible, the Woody Allen movie Sleeper, the 1979 science fiction film Alien (also referenced in Alien 3 and Alien: Covenant), the 1989 comedy When Harry Met Sally..., the 2008 film Max Payne, the 2010 film Megamind, and episodes of the American TV shows The Simpsons, Mad Men and Ed, Edd n Eddy. Episode 508 of Mystery Science Theater 3000 features a spoof of the drinking bird called the Bobbing Buzzard, which runs on carrion instead of water. In S4E11 of the comedy series Arrested Development, a delusional character hears the voice of God speaking through a drinking bird. In Episode 7 of Season 2, Headspace, of Ted Lasso on AppleTV, a non-functioning drinking bird is prominently displayed on the desk of the team psychologist.

Among video games, the drinking bird appeared as the "dunkin' dragon" in the Sierra game Quest for Glory (1989), in the Gremlin Interactive game Normality (1996), and as a "water bird" furniture item in the Animal Crossing games (2001). Porygon2, a Pokémon introduced in Generation II (Pokémon Gold and Silver), resembles a drinking bird, and in 3D Pokémon games, it moves its head in a "dipping" motion. More recently, in the game Quantum Conundrum (2012), one of the main gameplay mechanics is a drinking bird that is used as a timer to press buttons. In the 2014 Creative Assembly video game Alien: Isolation, drinking birds are frequently seen on desks across the game's main setting, Sevastopol Station.

In Australian contemporary playwright John Romeril's play The Floating World, drinking birds are a symbolic prop which represent the progression of Les' insanity. They are referred to as "dippy birds" and are perhaps used to symbolize insanity due to Romeril's opinion that they are insane for their uselessness and repeatability.

Alternative design 
In 2003 an alternative mechanism was devised by Nadine Abraham and Peter Palffy-Muhoray of Ohio, USA, that utilizes capillary action combined with evaporation to produce motion, but has no volatile working fluid. Their paper "A Dunking Bird of the Second Kind", was submitted to the American Journal of Physics, and published in June 2004. It describes a mechanism which, while similar to the original drinking bird, operates without a temperature difference. Instead it utilizes a combination of capillary action, gravitational potential difference and the evaporation of water to power the device.

This bird works as follows: it is balanced such that, when dry, it tips into a head-down position. The bird is placed next to a water source such that this position brings its beak into contact with water. Water is then lifted into the beak by capillary action (the authors used a triangular sponge) and carried by capillary action past the fulcrum to a larger sponge reservoir which they fashioned to resemble wings. When enough water has been absorbed by the reservoir, the now-heavy bottom causes the bird to tip into a head-up position. With the beak out of the water, eventually enough water evaporates from the sponge that the original balance is restored and the head tips down again. Although a small drop in temperature may occur due to evaporative cooling, this does not contribute to the motion of the bird. The device operates relatively slowly with 7 hours 22 minutes being the average cycle time measured.

See also 
 Minto wheel - a heat engine consisting of a set of sealed chambers with volatile fluid inside just as in the drinking bird
Cryophorus -  a glass container with two bulbs containing liquid water and water vapor. It is used in physics courses to demonstrate rapid freezing by evaporation
Heat pipe  -  a heat-transfer device that employs phase transition to transfer heat between two solid interfaces.
 Thermodynamics - the branch of physics concerned with heat and temperature and their relation to energy and work

References

External links

 

1940s toys
Birds in popular culture
Educational toys
Novelty items
Thermodynamics
Bird
Water toys
Articles containing video clips